David Baseggio (born October 28, 1967) is a Canadian former professional ice hockey defenceman and coach. Baseggio was selected by the Buffalo Sabres in the fourth round (68th overall) of the 1986 NHL Entry Draft. He is currently employed as the director of pro scouting for the Seattle Kraken of the National Hockey League.

Born in 1967 in Niagara Falls, Ontario, Baseggio attended Yale University, where he played four seasons of NCAA Division I college hockey with the Yale Bulldogs men's ice hockey team. He began to play professionally in 1989, and went on the play 619 games in a career that spanned eleven seasons in the American Hockey League, International Hockey League, and Europe. Baseggio retired as a player following the 1999–2000 ECHL season to become an assistant coach with the 2000–01 Charlotte Checkers of the ECHL. 

For the 2001-02 AHL season, he joined the Bridgeport Sound Tigers as an assistant coach and he was named the head coach of the Sound Tigers prior to the 2005-06 AHL season. Baseggio was then named head coach of the Peoria Rivermen in the American Hockey League starting the 2006-07 AHL season, where he remained for two seasons. His career then took him to the Anaheim Ducks organization in the National Hockey League, serving at a pro scout starting in the 2008-09 season, before taking on responsibilities as pro scouting director and assistant to the general manager. In July 2020, Baseggio joined the Seattle Kraken as the team's pro scouting director.

Career statistics

Awards and honors

References

External links

1967 births
Living people
Anaheim Ducks executives
Anaheim Ducks scouts
Bolzano HC players
Buffalo Sabres draft picks
Canadian ice hockey defencemen
Cleveland Lumberjacks players
Detroit Vipers players
Grand Rapids Griffins players
Houston Aeros (1994–2013) players
Ice hockey people from Ontario
Indianapolis Ice players
New Haven Nighthawks players
Rochester Americans players
SC Lyss players
Sportspeople from Niagara Falls, Ontario
Worcester IceCats players
Yale Bulldogs men's ice hockey players
Canadian expatriate ice hockey players in Italy